Kankool is a locality in the Hunter Region of New South Wales, Australia. A now closed railway station was located on the Main North railway line. The station opened in 1909, and no trace now remains.

References

Towns in New South Wales
Main North railway line, New South Wales